The first season of Happy Endings, an American television series, premiered on April 13, 2011 and concluded on August 24 of the same year. ABC officially picked up the show on May 18, 2010, where it premiered on April as a mid-season replacement,
 with a one-hour premiere of two back-to-back episodes starting at 9:30 pm ET/PT. In the weeks that followed, the show continued to air back-to-back episodes that began airing at 10:00 pm ET/PT.

Cast

Starring
 Eliza Coupe as Jane Kerkovich-Williams
 Elisha Cuthbert as Alex Kerkovich
 Zachary Knighton as Dave Rose
 Adam Pally as Max Blum
 Damon Wayans, Jr. as Brad Williams
 Casey Wilson as Penny Hartz

Recurring
 Stephen Guarino as Derrick (2 episodes)
 Travis Van Winkle as Bo Bazinski (2 episodes)
 Seth Morris as Scotty (1 episode)
 Paul Scheer as Avi (1 episode)
 Mikaela Hoover as Jackie (1 episode)

Notable guest stars
 Angelique Cabral as Waitress ("Pilot")
 Brett Gelman as Carl ("Your Couples Friends & Neighbors")
 Danielle Schneider as Dianne ("Your Couples Friends & Neighbors")
 Alan Rachins as Howard Blum ("Mein Coming Out")
 Caroline Aaron as Pauline Blum ("Mein Coming Out")
 Damon Wayans as Francis Williams ("Like Father, Like Gun")
 Rob Huebel as Alan Fitzgerald ("You've Got Male")
 Max Greenfield as Ian ("You've Got Male")
 Nat Faxon as Chef Leslie ("Bo Fight")
 Jon Daly as Brody Daniels ("Barefoot Pedaler")
 Nick Thune as Tommy ("Barefoot Pedaler")
 June Diane Raphael as Melinda Shershow ("The Shershow Redemption")
 T.J. Miller as Jason Shershow ("The Shershow Redemption")
 Gina Rodriguez as Rita ("Why Can't You Read Me")
 Meagen Fay as Barbara ("Why Can't You Read Me")
 Bre Blair as Kim ("Why Can't You Read Me")

Episodes 
The first season aired out of order. The list below is ordered by the production order which restores the chronology of the storyline. The series’ first season was presented in its proper production order on the season one DVD, was presented in broadcast order when it appeared on Hulu, and was presented in production order when it appeared on HBOMax.

Production 
On January 19, 2010, ABC green-lit the pilot episode, which was written by David Caspe and directed by Anthony Russo and Joe Russo. The show is from production companies Sony Pictures Television, ABC Studios, and executive producer Jamie Tarses' FanFare Productions. Executive producers are Jamie Tarses, Jonathan Groff and The Russo Brothers.

Casting announcements began in February 2010, with Damon Wayans, Jr. first cast as Brad, Jane's husband who does whatever she says. Next to join the series was Casey Wilson as Penny, the group's desperate and single friend. Eliza Coupe and Adam Pally shortly joined that cast, with Coupe playing Jane, Alex's control freak sister who is married to Brad, and Pally playing Max, Dave's close friend and roommate. Elisha Cuthbert later joined the cast as Alex, Dave's ex-fiancé who leaves him at the altar. Zachary Knighton was last actor to be cast as the newly single Dave.

The pilot was ordered to series on May 13, 2010, as a mid-season entry in the 2010–11 United States network television schedule.

ABC originally aired the episodes out of production order, affecting the continuity of the show. For example, Dave owns a food truck in the third episode to be aired, Your Couples Friends & Neighbors, though he doesn't get into the food truck business until the seventh episode to be aired, Dave of the Dead.  The DVD release puts the episodes back into their intended order.

Reception

Critical reception
The first season currently holds a 57 out of 100 rating from critics on Metacritic, which indicates mixed or average reviews.

While initially criticized, being negatively compared to several similar "relationship sitcoms" that had premiered earlier in the season  - Perfect Couples, Mad Love, Traffic Light and Friends with Benefits - all of which were canceled after one season. The series also drew comparisons from the hit 1990s sitcom Friends. However, as the season progressed, the reviews from critics became much warmer - with some admitting that it had grown on them and that it had improved since the pilot.

U.S. Ratings
The show's first season averaged 4 million viewers and a 1.7 rating in the adults among the 18-49 age demographic.

Home media

References 

2011 American television seasons